The Suppression of Heresy Act 1414 (2 Hen. V St. 1, c. 7) was an Act of the Parliament of England. The Act made heresy an offence against the common law and temporal officers were to swear to help the spiritual officers in the suppression of heresy. Justices of the peace were given the power of inquiry; to issue an order to arrest; and to hand over the suspected heretic to the ecclesiastical court for trial. It also enacted that

Notes

Acts of the Parliament of England concerning religion
1410s in law
1414 in England
Christianity and law in the 15th century